The Year of Living Dangerously may refer to:

 The Year of Living Dangerously (novel), a 1978 novel by Christopher Koch set in Indonesia in the summer and fall of 1965
 The Year of Living Dangerously (film), a 1982 Peter Weir film adapted from the novel
"Year of Living Dangerously", a song from the 2012 Scissor Sisters album Magic Hour

See also
The Year of Dreaming Dangerously, a work by Slavoj Zizek
 "The Year of Washing Dangerously", an episode of King of the Hill
 Years of Living Dangerously, a documentary television series
 The Year of Living Biblically, a 2007 book
The Year of Voting Dangerously by Maureen Dowd, a collection of her New York Times columns; 2016